Dissoptera is a genus of hoverfly, insects in the family Syrphidae, in the order Diptera. It consists of seven species distributed through the Australasian and Oriental regions.

References

Hoverfly genera
Eristalinae
Diptera of Asia
Diptera of Australasia
Taxa named by Frederick Wallace Edwards